The 1982–83 Roller Hockey Champions Cup was the 17th edition of the Roller Hockey Champions Cup organized by CERH.

Barcelona achieved their eighth title.

Teams
The champions of the main European leagues, and Barcelona as title holders, played this competition, consisting in a double-legged knockout tournament. As Barcelona qualified also as Spanish champion, Sentmenat joined also the competition.

Bracket

Source:

References

External links
 CERH website

1982 in roller hockey
1983 in roller hockey
Rink Hockey Euroleague